John Harrison (1693–1776) was a clockmaker who designed and built the world's first successful marine chronometers.

John Harrison may also refer to:

Politicians
John Harrison (died 1669) (1590–1669), English politician who sat in the House of Commons as MP for Lancaster variously between 1640 and 1669
John Harrison (Canadian politician) (1908–1964), member of Parliament for Meadow Lake, Saskatchewan
John Harrison (diplomat), 17th century English diplomat
John Harrison (mayor) (fl. 1980s–2020s), former mayor of North Tyneside, England
John C. Harrison (judge) (1913–2011), Associate Justice of the Montana Supreme Court
John Scott Harrison (1804–1878), American Congressman for Ohio, 1853–1857; son of President William Henry Harrison and the father of President Benjamin Harrison
Richard Harrison (New Zealand politician) (1921–2003), New Zealand politician with the given name of John

Sports
John Harrison (footballer, born 1927) (1927–2015), English professional footballer
John Harrison (footballer, born 1961), English professional footballer
John Harrison (rower) (1924–2012), Australian Olympic rower
Jack Harrison (American football) (John Martin Harrison, 1875–1952), University of Minnesota football coach and player
Jack Harrison (boxer) (John Harrison, 1888–1970), British boxer

Musicians
John Harrison, folk musician with The Watersons
John Harrison, bassist for Hawkwind

Military
John Harrison (VC 1857) (1832–1865), Irish recipient of the Victoria Cross
Jack Harrison (VC) (1890–1917), English army officer and recipient of the Victoria Cross

Other people
John Harrison (director), writer, director, producer, and music composer
John Harrison (engraver) (1872–1954), British stamp engraver
John Harrison (historian) (1847–1922), Scottish merchant, master tailor and historical author
John Harrison (ice cream taster) (born 1942), American ice cream taster
John Harrison (Leeds) (1579–1656), 16th century benefactor of the Yorkshire town
John B. Harrison (1861–1947), justice of the Oklahoma Supreme Court
John C. Harrison (law professor) (fl. 1970s–2020s), American law professor
J. F. C. Harrison (John Fletcher Clews Harrison, 1921–2018), English historian
J. Hartwell Harrison (John Hartwell Harrison, 1909–1984), urologic surgeon
John Henry Harrison was a 38-year-old African-American man who was lynched in Malvern, Hot Spring County, Arkansas by masked men on February 2, 1922
John Kent Harrison, television producer, director and writer
John Leonard Harrison (1917–1972), British zoologist
John Vernon Harrison (1892–1972), British structural geologist, explorer and cartographer
M. John Harrison (born 1945), author

Characters
John Harrison (Brookside), fictional character on the defunct British TV soap opera Brookside
Khan Noonien Singh, the antagonist from Star Trek Into Darkness (John Harrison given as false name)
John Harrison, fictional character on the American TV series Popular

See also
Jon Harrison (disambiguation)
Jonathan Baxter Harrison (1835–1907), Unitarian minister and journalist
Jack Harrison (disambiguation)